Ryan Rems Sarita (born November 3, 1978) is a Filipino comedian, Sultan and television personality. He was the first Funny One grand winner of the ABS-CBN noontime variety show, It's Showtime.

Personal life
He holds a degree of Communication Arts from Centro Escolar University. He once worked as a call center agent, an online English tutor, and a member of a rock band. He was influenced by popular rock icons like Elvis Presley and The Beatles as well as American retired wrestler Ric Flair. He also tried his luck applying for a writer position in different television networks but failed to make the cut.

Career

Sarita has been an amateur comedian since 2008, but didn't get noticed until 2015 when he rose to fame as a contestant for It's Showtime's The Funny One, a segment dedicated for budding comedians. Dubbed as Rakistang Komikero (Rocker Comedian), he is notable for his non-sequitur anti-humor and deadpan delivery of jokes as well as his famous catchphrase "O'right! Rock 'N Roll to the World" that eventually became popular online.  He was already eliminated in the earlier rounds, but was given a second chance in the wildcard and face-off rounds. He was given an almost perfect score by the judges to become the first-ever grand winner of the competition. He once performed with Hong Kong-based famous stand-up comedian Vivek Mahbubani during a gig in Cebu.

On August 10, 2015, he made his debut as an It's Showtime's resident stand-up comedian and one of show's co-hosts, Vanessa Kins. March 28, 2017. He, along with veteran comedian Bayani Agbayani and other Funny One finalists, is set to star in a new sitcom entitled Funny Ka Pare Ko.

He is one of the comedians of Comedy Manila, an organization that produces quality comedy shows featuring local and foreign acts in the Philippines.

Filmography

Television

Bagani as Damo * 2018, ABS-CBN
Banana Sundae as Guest  * 2017, ABS-CBN
Langit Lupa as Jawo  * 2016, ABS-CBN
My Super D as Steve * 2016, ABS-CBN
Funny Ka, Pare Ko as Cool Rocker * 2016, (Cine Mo! Channel)
Rated K as himself/Guest *  2015  ABS-CBN
Matanglawin as Guest * 2015, ABS-CBN
It's Showtime as 2015 - Grand Winner, My Funny One Segment & Now Co-Host ABS-CBN

References

Filipino male comedians
Living people
People from Quezon City
Centro Escolar University alumni
Participants in Philippine reality television series
1978 births